The  Econometric Society is an international society of academic economists interested in applying statistical tools in the practiced of econometrics. It is an independent organization with no connections to societies of professional mathematicians or statisticians.

It was founded on December 29, 1930, at the Statler Hotel in Cleveland, Ohio. Its first president was Irving Fisher.

As of 2014, there are about 700 Elected Fellows of the Econometric Society, making it one of the most prevalent research affiliations. New fellows are elected each year by the current fellows.

The sixteen founding members were Ragnar Frisch, Charles F. Roos, Joseph A. Schumpeter, Harold Hotelling, Henry Schultz, Karl Menger, Edwin B. Wilson, Frederick C. Mills, William F. Ogburn, J. Harvey Rogers, Malcolm C. Rorty, Carl Snyder, Walter A. Shewhart, Øystein Ore, Ingvar Wedervang and Norbert Wiener. The first president was Irving Fisher.

The Econometric Society sponsors the Economics academic journal Econometrica and publishes the journals Theoretical Economics and Quantitative Economics.

Officers
The Econometric Society is led by a president, who serves a one-year term. Election as a Fellow of the Econometric Society is considered by much of the economics profession to be an honor.

 List of presidents of the Econometric Society
 List of fellows of the Econometric Society

Honorary lectures 
The Econometric Society sponsors several annual awards, in which the honored member delivers a lecture:
 Frisch Medal
 Walras–Bowley Lecture
 Fisher–Schultz Lecture
 Jacob Marschak Lecture

References

External links 

 
Economics societies
Econometrics